Maraetai is a coastal town and the easternmost suburb of greater Auckland in New Zealand. 

The closest town, Beachlands, lies approximately 4 km to the west. Its name is Māori meaning "meeting place by the sea". Maraetai was the original name for the smooth, calm tidal passage now known as Tamaki Strait, which is sheltered by Te Motu Arai-roa ("The Long Sheltering Island") now called Waiheke Island. The site of present-day Maraetai suburb was formerly the pā and kāinga (village) settlement known as Pohaturoa. In English, Maraetai means "meeting place by the sea". One of the better known functions of a marae is to facilitate hui (tribal gatherings).  

Maraetai's residents do not use city mains water and instead must use water tanks and bore water. Many residents prefer it to be kept this way to maintain the town's rural aspect. Maraetai's beaches are popular destinations for other Aucklanders and are often crowded in the summer months.

Demographics

Maraetai had a population of 2,346 at the 2018 New Zealand census, an increase of 147 people (6.7%) since the 2013 census, and an increase of 483 people (25.9%) since the 2006 census. There were 831 households, comprising 1,170 males and 1,176 females, giving a sex ratio of 0.99 males per female. The median age was 42.4 years (compared with 37.4 years nationally), with 486 people (20.7%) aged under 15 years, 357 (15.2%) aged 15 to 29, 1,170 (49.9%) aged 30 to 64, and 330 (14.1%) aged 65 or older.

Ethnicities were 93.9% European/Pākehā, 9.5% Māori, 2.9% Pacific peoples, 2.9% Asian, and 2.0% other ethnicities. People may identify with more than one ethnicity.

The percentage of people born overseas was 28.3, compared with 27.1% nationally.

Although some people chose not to answer the census's question about religious affiliation, 54.3% had no religion, 36.8% were Christian, 0.1% had Māori religious beliefs, 0.1% were Muslim, 0.4% were Buddhist and 1.7% had other religions.

Of those at least 15 years old, 498 (26.8%) people had a bachelor's or higher degree, and 216 (11.6%) people had no formal qualifications. The median income was $48,700, compared with $31,800 nationally. 624 people (33.5%) earned over $70,000 compared to 17.2% nationally. The employment status of those at least 15 was that 1,047 (56.3%) people were employed full-time, 282 (15.2%) were part-time, and 48 (2.6%) were unemployed.

Education

References

Populated places in the Auckland Region
Beaches of the Auckland Region
Populated places around the Hauraki Gulf / Tīkapa Moana